Jaber Saeed Salem (born Yani Marchokov, 3 January 1975) is a Qatari weightlifter who competed in the Men's 105+ kg weight class at the 2000 Summer Olympics and finished fourth with a 460 kg total (205 kg and 255 kg). He was born in Bulgaria.

One of eight Bulgarian weightlifters recruited by the Qatar Olympic Committee for $1,000,000, Jaber became a Qatari citizen to represent the country in the 2000 Olympics. His old name, Yani Marchokov, was left behind in the process. Qatar has been known for recruiting sportspeople from other countries, the most notable examples being fellow weightlifter Said Saif Asaad (formerly Angel Popov of Bulgaria) and world-class runner Saif Saaeed Shaheen.

At the 2003 World Championships, he snatched 210 kg which turned out to be the gold medal in the snatch competition. He withdrew from the clean and jerk.

Jaber was set to compete at the 2004 Summer Olympics, but pulled out.

At the 2005 World Championships, he won the bronze medal with a total of 446 kg, and at the 2007 World Championships, he won the bronze medal with a total of 435 kg.

Major results

References

External links
 
 
 
 

1975 births
Living people
Bulgarian emigrants to Qatar
Qatari male weightlifters
Olympic weightlifters of Qatar
Weightlifters at the 2000 Summer Olympics
Weightlifters at the 2008 Summer Olympics
Asian Games medalists in weightlifting
Naturalised citizens of Qatar
Weightlifters at the 2006 Asian Games
Asian Games silver medalists for Qatar
Medalists at the 2006 Asian Games
World Weightlifting Championships medalists